Sir Arthur Champernowne (c. 1524 – 1578) was an English politician and soldier.

Arthur Champernowne may also refer to:
 Sir Arthur Champernowne (diplomat), born c. 1562
Arthur Champernowne (died c. 1650)
Arthur Champernowne (died 1717)